Lorian Graham (born 8 November 1977) is a former Australian racing cyclist. She won the Australian national road race title in 2005.

See also
2008 Vrienden van het Platteland season

References

External links

1977 births
Living people
Australian female cyclists
Place of birth missing (living people)